Below the bulla ethmoidalis, and partly hidden by the inferior end of the uncinate process of ethmoid bone, is the maxillary hiatus (or ostium maxillare, or maxillary sinus ostium, or maxillary ostium, or opening from the maxillary sinus); in a frontal section this opening is seen to be placed near the roof of the sinus. In the articulated skull this aperture is much reduced in size by the following bones: the uncinate process of the ethmoid above, the ethmoidal process of the inferior nasal concha below, the vertical part of the palatine behind, and a small part of the lacrimal above and in front; the sinus communicates with the middle meatus of the nose, generally by two small apertures left between the above-mentioned bones.

Additional images

References

Nose